"Family Ties" (stylized in all lowercase) is a song by American rappers Baby Keem and Kendrick Lamar. The song was released on August 27, 2021, by Columbia Records and pgLang. The song serves as the fourth single from Keem's debut album, The Melodic Blue. The song also serves as Lamar’s first musical release under pgLang, a production company he co-founded in March 2020.

"Family Ties" marks Lamar's first single and new music since "Pray for Me" with Canadian singer The Weeknd, released in 2018. The song also marks the first official collaboration between Keem and Lamar, who are real-life cousins, hence the name of the song, as well as the single’s cover art depicting them in a family portrait, which pays homage to the album cover of Lamar's 2012 breakout album good kid, m.A.A.d city. The accompanying music video features a cameo from singer Normani; and won the 2022 BET Award for Video of the Year.

Accolades
The song received two nominations at the 2022 Grammy Awards for Best Rap Song and Best Rap Performance, winning the latter award. It also received two nominations for Song of the Year and Video of the Year at the 2022 XXL Awards.

Music video
The accompanying music video was directed by Dave Free, and features a cameo from singer Normani, alongside Baby Keem, and Lamar who is billed mid-video as Oklama.

In the first scene, the music video begins with a moshpit of black men, who are wearing black bombers and sunglasses surrounding Keem and Lamar, with the two artists wearing orange attire. Black ballerinas are also featured. In the second scene, Lamar raps about still being relevant in hip-hop despite taking a hiatus. Near the end of the music video, Normani appears in a stretch limo SUV alongside the two rappers, before the rappers make their last proclamations. Throughout the video, clips of different sizes and themes are placed on top of the video, overlapping the ones below them. The video is divided into two "scenes", with scene 1 representing Keem's section, and scene 2 representing Lamar's section.

Critical reception
In a review for the track, Pitchfork wrote that "Kendrick's oddball raps and nonsensical flow switches express a newfound creative freedom. His future is his own."

Charts

Weekly charts

Year-end charts

Certifications

References

Songs about families
2021 singles
2021 songs
Baby Keem songs
Kendrick Lamar songs
Song recordings produced by Cardo (record producer)
Songs written by Kendrick Lamar
Music videos directed by Dave Free
Columbia Records singles
Grammy Award for Best Rap Performance